Felipe VI has received titles, decorations, and honorary appointments as monarch of Spain and before as heir apparent to the throne of Spain: his titles and styles are listed by precedence of rank, nobility, and honour.

Titles and styles

 30 January 19681 November 1977: His Royal Highness Infante Felipe of Spain
 1 November 197719 June 2014: His Royal Highness The Prince of Asturias
In former Crown of Aragon territories: 22 January 197719 June 2014: His Royal Highness The Prince of Girona
In former Kingdom of Navarre territory: 22 January 197719 June 2014: His Royal Highness The Prince of Viana
He was also the Duke of Montblanc, Count of Cervera and Lord of Balaguer from 1977 to 2014.
 19 June 2014present: His Majesty  The King of Spain

Honours

Spanish Honours
 : 
 21st Grand Master and 1,182nd Knight of the Spanish Order of the Golden Fleece
 Grand Master and Knight of the Collar of the Order of Charles III
 De facto Sovereign of the Order of Queen Maria Luisa
 Grand Master of the Order of Isabella the Catholic
 Grand Master of the Order of Civil Merit
 Grand Master of the Civil Order of Alfonso X, the Wise
 Grand Master of the Order of St. Raymond of Peñafort
 Grand Master of the Order of Constitutional Merit
 Grand Master of the Royal and Military Order of St. Ferdinand
 Grand Master and Knight Grand Cross with White Decoration of the Order of Military Merit
 Grand Master and Knight Grand Cross with White Decoration of the Order of Naval Merit
 Grand Master and Knight Grand Cross with White Decoration of the Order of Aeronautical Merit
 Grand Master of the Royal Military Order of St. Hermenegild
 Grand Master of the Decoration of Merit of Civil Guards
 Grand Master of the Royal Military Order of Calatrava
 Grand Master of the Royal Military Order of Santiago
 Grand Master of the Royal Military Order of Alcántara
 Grand Master of the Royal Military Order of Montesa
 Plus Ultra Medal - INI.

Foreign honours
 : 
 Recipient of the Order of Agostinho Neto (7 February 2023)
 : 
 Grand Cross of the Order of May of Military Merit
 Collar of the Order of the Liberator General San Martín
 : 
 Grand Decoration of Honour in Gold with Sash for Services to the Republic of Austria
 : 
 Grand Cordon of the Order of Leopold
 :
 Grand Cross of the Order of the Southern Cross
 : 
 Grand Cross with Collar of the Order of Merit
 : 
 Grand Collar of the Order of Boyaca
 : 
 Collar of the Order of Christopher Columbus (24 April 1987)
 :
 Grand Cross of the National Order of San Lorenzo
 : 
 Grand Cross with Gold Star of the Order of José Matías Delgado
 :
 Member 1st Class of the Order of the Cross of Terra Mariana
 : 
 Grand Cross of the Order of the Legion of Honour
 :
 Grand Cross 1st class of the Order of Merit of the Federal Republic of Germany (11 November 2002)
 Grand Cross Special Class of the Order of Merit of the Federal Republic of Germany (17 October 2022)
 : 
 Grand Cross of the Order of the Redeemer
 :
 Grand Cross of the Order of Francisco Morazán
 : 
 Grand Cross of the Order of Merit of the Republic of Hungary
 : 
 Knight Grand Cross of the Order of Merit of the Italian Republic
  Knight Grand Cross with Collar of the Order of Merit of the Italian Republic (25 October 2021)
 : 
 Collar of the Order of the Chrysanthemum
 : 
 Grand Cordon of the Supreme Order of the Renaissance
 : 
 Commander Grand Cross of the Order of the Three Stars
 : 
 Grand Cordon of the Order of Merit
 : 
 Grand Cross of the Order of Adolphe of Nassau
: 
 Collar of the Order of the Aztec Eagle (26 June 2015)
 Order of the Aztec Eagle, Sash (25 January 1996)
: 
Member Special Class of the Order of Muhammad
: 
 Knight Grand Cross of the Order of Orange-Nassau
 Recipient of the King Willem-Alexander Inauguration Medal
: 
 Grand Cross of the Order of St. Olav
: 
 Extraordinary Grand Cross of the Order of Vasco Núñez de Balboa
 : 
 Grand Cross with Diamonds of the Order of the Sun of Peru (7 July 2015)
 Grand Cross of the Order of Merit for Distinguished Service (12 November 2018)
: 
 Grand Cross of the Order of Lakandula (3 December 2007)
 Grand Cross of the Order of Sikatuna (2 April 1995)
 : 
 Grand Cross of the Order of Merit of the Republic of Poland (24 September 2003)
 : 
 Grand Collar of the Order of the Tower and Sword (28 November 2016)
 Grand Cross of the Order of the Tower and Sword (25 September 2006) 
 Grand Officer of the Order of the Tower and Sword (23 May 1996)
 Grand Cross of the Order of Christ (13 October 1988)
 Grand Cross of the Order of Aviz (22 April 1991)
 Grand Cross with Collar of the Order of Liberty (15 April 2018)
: 
 Grand Cross of the Order of the Star of Romania (26 November 2007)
 : 
 Collar of the Order of King Abdulaziz (15 January 2017)
 :
 Grand Gwanghwa Medal of the Order of Diplomatic Service Merit (12 February 2007)
 Recipient of the Grand Order of Mugunghwa (15 June 2021)
 :
 Knight later Collar of the Royal Order of the Seraphim (17 December 1991; 24 November 2021)
 Recipient of the 50th Birthday Badge Medal of King Carl XVI Gustaf (30 April 1996)
 : 
 Honorary Knight Grand Cross of the Royal Victorian Order (17 October 1988)
 Stranger Knight of the Most Noble Order of the Garter (12 July 2017)
 : 
  Knight of the Collar of the Order of the Holy Sepulchre (1 April 2022)
  North Atlantic Treaty Organization
 Serge Lazareff Prize (2 May 2018)

Honorific eponyms 

Cáceres: Estadio Príncipe Felipe (Prince Felipe Stadium)
Oviedo: Auditorio-Palacio de Congresos de Oviedo Príncipe Felipe (Prince Felipe Auditorium and Congress Palace of Oviedo)
Valencia: Prince Felipe Museum of Sciences
Valencia: Centro de Investigación Príncipe Felipe, CIPF (Prince Felipe Research Centre)
Zaragoza: Prince Felipe Arena
Spanish aircraft carrier Príncipe de Asturias (R-11) (Spanish aircraft carrier Prince of Asturias)

Washington, D.C.: Prince of Asturias Chair in Spanish Studies in the Edmund A. Walsh School of Foreign Service, Georgetown University
 World Peace & Liberty Award
 New York City: Foreign Policy Association Medal

Other honours

Basilica di Santa Maria Maggiore: Protocanon (ex officio) 19 June 2014present
Basilica di San Paolo fuori le Mura: Protocanon (ex officio) 19 June 2014present
  International Olympic Committee: Recipient of the Gold Olympic Order (18 December 2013)

Scholastic 
Spanish Royal Academies
 Spanish Royal Academies Board: High Patron (ex officio) 19 June 2014present

Military Ranks

 1 August 19857 July 1986: Officer Cadet, Spanish Army
 7 July 19867 July 1989: Cadet 2nd Lieutenant, Spanish Army
 10 July 19867 July 1989: Midshipman, Spanish Navy
 10 July 19877 July 1989: Cadet 2nd Lieutenant, Spanish Air Force
 7 July 19891 December 2000: Lieutenant, Spanish Army
 7 July 19891 December 2000: Ensign, Spanish Navy
 7 July 19891 December 2000: Lieutenant, Spanish Air Force
 18 March 199626 June 1996: Qualified Helicopter Pilot, 402 Training Squadron, Spanish Air Force
 1 December 20003 July 2009: Commandant, Spanish Army
 1 December 20003 July 2009: Corvette Captain, Spanish Navy
 1 December 2000  3 July 2009: Commandant, Spanish Air Force
 3 July 200919 June 2014: Lieutenant Colonel, Spanish Army
 3 July 200919 June 2014: Frigate Captain, Spanish Navy
 3 July 200919 June 2014: Lieutenant Colonel, Spanish Air Force
 19 June 2014present: Captain General of the Spanish Armed Forces

See also
 List of titles and honours of Queen Letizia of Spain
 List of titles and honours of Leonor, Princess of Asturias
 List of titles and honours of the Spanish Crown
 List of honours of the Spanish Royal Family by country

References

List of titles and honours of Felipe VI of Spain
Lists of titles by person of Spain
Spanish monarchy

Grand Masters of the Order of the Golden Fleece
Knights of the Golden Fleece of Spain
Grand Masters of the Order of Isabella the Catholic
Collars of the Order of Isabella the Catholic
Knights Grand Cross of the Order of Isabella the Catholic
Knights of the Order of Alcántara
Grand Crosses of the Royal and Military Order of San Hermenegild
Knights of the Order of Montesa
Knights of Calatrava
Knights of Santiago
Grand Crosses of Military Merit
Grand Crosses of Naval Merit
Crosses of Aeronautical Merit

Grand Cordons of the Order of Merit (Lebanon)
Grand Croix of the Légion d'honneur
Grand Crosses of the Order of the Sun of Peru
Grand Crosses of the Order of Aviz
Grand Crosses of the Order of Christ (Portugal)
Grand Crosses of the Order of Lakandula
Grand Crosses of the Order of Merit of the Republic of Hungary (civil)
Grand Crosses of the Order of the Star of Romania
Knights Grand Cross of the Order of Merit of the Italian Republic
Knights Grand Cross of the Order of Orange-Nassau
Honorary Knights Grand Cross of the Royal Victorian Order
Recipients of the Order of the Cross of Terra Mariana, 1st Class
Recipients of the Grand Decoration with Sash for Services to the Republic of Austria
Grand Crosses of the Order of José Matías Delgado
Grand Crosses of the Order of Christopher Columbus
Grand Crosses with Diamonds of the Order of the Sun of Peru
Collars of the Order of the Liberator General San Martin
Extra Knights Companion of the Garter